
Gmina Zarszyn is a rural gmina (administrative district) in Sanok County, Subcarpathian Voivodeship, in south-eastern Poland.

Ethnic Groups
Poles

Villages
Gmina Zarszyn contains the villages and settlements of Bażanówka, Chmurówka, Długie, Granicznik, Jaćmierz, Koszary, Mroczkówki, Nowosielce, Odrzechowa, Pastwiska, Pielnia, Posada Jaćmierska Górna, Posada Zarszyńska and Zarszyn.

Neighbouring gminas
Gmina Zarszyn is bordered by the gminas of Besko, Brzozów, Bukowsko, Haczów, Rymanów and Sanok.

References
Polish official population figures 2006

Rural landscape picture

Zarszyn
Sanok County